The Ophel ostracon or KAI 190, is an ostracon discovered in Jerusalem in 1924 by R. A. Stewart Macalister and John Garrow Duncan, in the area of Wadi Hilweh (known as the City of David). It is attributed to the 7th century BCE.

Discovery
Macalister and Duncan described the discovery as follows, referring to the 1909 expedition of Montagu Brownlow Parker:

This sherd was discovered in the large cave under Field No. 9, and seems to have formed part of the dump which the Parker party deposited in that cave; its exact original provenance is therefore uncertain, though it must have come from somewhere in the neighboring tunnel, and probably not far off.

The ostracon measures 4 inches by 3 inches. The inscription, written in Pre-Exilic Hebrew, is thought to have originally been eight lines, of which five are decipherable (the first four and the last). According to a 2015 study, "virtually all scholars agree that it contains a list of personal names with theophoric elements."

It is currently at the Rockefeller Museum.

See also
 Ophel pithos
 Archaeology of Israel

References

1924 archaeological discoveries
Hebrew inscriptions
KAI inscriptions
Ancient Israel and Judah
Ostracon